Leben or Lebena (Λέβηνα) or Lebene (Λεβήνη) was a maritime town of ancient Crete, a harbour of Gortyna, about 70 stadia inland. It possessed a temple of Asclepius, of great celebrity. In the Peutinger Table its name appears as Ledena. According to the Stadiasmus Maris Magni, it had a harbour and was located 270 stadia from Biannus and 50 stadia from Halas.

The site of Leben is located near modern Lentas.

See also 
 List of ancient Greek cities

References

Populated places in ancient Crete
Former populated places in Greece
Ancient Greek archaeological sites in Greece
Archaeological sites in Crete